Heights High School, formerly John H. Reagan High School, is a senior high school located in the Houston Heights in Houston, Texas. It serves students in grades nine through twelve and is a part of the Houston Independent School District.

Heights High School is HISD's Magnet School of Computer Technology and offers the International Baccalaureate Programme (IB) Middle Years Program (till 10th grade) and twenty Advanced Placement (AP) courses. Students join one of the following academies: Computer Magnet Academy, Health Science Academy, Business Academy, Engineering Academy, or Transportation Academy.
The principal of Heights High School is Wendy Hampton.

History
Houston Heights High School was first established for Heights residents in 1904, as an elementary through high school. Its initial site was lots 8-17 of Houston Heights Block 185, on what is now Milroy Park.

When the Heights joined the City of Houston in 1918, the building at the end of Heights Boulevard and 20th known today as Hamilton Middle School became the Senior High School, and the old location became a Junior High School.  When the original building on Yale and 12th burned in 1924, a new location for the high school was picked in the block between Oxford and Arlington, 13th and 14th.  The new school was named John H. Reagan High School and opened in 1926 with the student body and teachers marching down Heights Blvd from the old school building to the new high school on 13th Street. Reagan was built on the entirety of blocks 166 and 167.

The campus was designed by John Staub and William Ward Watkin, who were designers of the original campus of Rice University. Reagan was first established as an all-white high school.

Overcrowding at Reagan was relieved by Waltrip High School when Waltrip opened in 1959.

Reagan High was previously reserved for white children (Hispanics being categorized as white prior to 1970) but it desegregated by 1970. Its student body started to become increasingly Hispanic; by 1988 Reagan was mostly Hispanic. In 1997 a portion of the Reagan boundary was rezoned to Waltrip.

In 2006 Reagan began a renovation project. Set to end in the summer of 2007, the renovations to Reagan included the building of a new cafeteria, a new gymnasium complex, an additional academic building, a new vocational building, and a library.

Circa 2006 Connie Berger became the principal of Reagan. In 2009 Berger expected around 100 former private school students to enroll because the economic conditions persuaded families to send their children to public school instead of private school.

Around 2012, each year a total of 400 students transfer from Booker T. Washington High School to Reagan and Waltrip High School.

The HISD board voted to rename the school to Heights High School in 2016. In June 2016 a group of eight Houston area residents, including alumni and parents, sued HISD to get an injunction to prevent the name changes; they did so after HISD did not accept their ultimatum to stop the name changes. Wayne Dolcefino serves as their spokesperson. The case was rejected in court with prejudice.

Campus

In 2006 Reagan began a renovation project that included the building of a new cafeteria, a new gymnasium complex, an additional academic building, a new vocational building, and a library.  
The school now also has an auditorium, a teaching theater, dance rooms, technology rooms, a piano lab, a choir/band hall, and a library with computers where the students can do research. It also has a two-story parking garage, an auto shop, and large track and field.

In 2012 Richard Connelly of the Houston Press ranked Reagan as the sixth most architecturally beautiful high school campus in Greater Houston. Connelly said that a coworker told him that Reagan looked like Rydell High School in Grease.

Academic programs
Health and Science Academy: classes and shadowing at health care facilities; seniors can work entry level health positions in partnership with Ben Taub Hospital.
Business Academy: classes and hands-on experience.
Magnet Academy for Computer Technology: options include audio/video production, computer programming and digital media/web technology.  The school’s A/V program is the only authorized Apple training center in the Houston area, giving students the opportunity to earn certification in Apple Final Cut Pro video editing software.
Engineering and Design Academy – Students participate in VEX and FIRST Robotics, and have access to a NAO Humanoid Robot for programming, Markerbots 3D printers and an Arduino electronics lab.
Transportation Academy – Students study in specialized labs designed for automotive mechanics and repair.  The program is certified by NATEF and students compete in SkillsUSA competitions.
International Baccalaureate – (IB) – In 2013, Reagan became an official IB World School offering the Middle Years Programme (from 6th to 10th grade) in partnership with Hogg Middle School.

Student body
In 2006 the school had 1,600 students. In 2016 it had 2,340 students.

Athletics
2014 was Heights High’s first year in the 6A Conference. The football team is cheered on by Bulldog Cheerleaders, the “redcoats”, and a marching band composed of about 140 students.

Neighborhoods served by the school
Heights High School takes students from most of the Houston Heights neighborhood, a small portion of Downtown Houston, the Fourth Ward, East Norhill, Woodland Heights, Brooke Smith, Magnolia Grove, Stude the Old Sixth Ward, The Historic 1st Ward, and a small portion of Midtown. Other parts of Houston northwest of downtown within the 610 Loop are zoned to Heights High as well.
Originally, all of the Houston Heights was zoned to the school. In 1997, a small portion was rezoned to Waltrip.

The following Houston Housing Authority public housing complexes, all in the Fourth Ward, are zoned to Heights High: Historic Oaks of Allen Parkway Village, Historical Rental Initiative (30 single-family houses), and Victory Place.

Feeder patterns
Middle schools feeding into Heights High School include Gregory-Lincoln Education Center, Alexander Hamilton, and Hogg,

Elementary schools that feed indirectly into Heights through the above middle schools include Browning
Field
Harvard
(partial)
Crockett
Gregory-Lincoln Education Center
Helms
Jefferson
Ketelsen (partial)
Love
Memorial (partial), and Travis (partial).

Magnet students must follow the HISD Magnet application process and may apply from all HISD areas.

Notable alumni
 Red Adair (Class of 1931), oil well firefighter
 Mary Kay Ash (Class of 1934), founder of Mary Kay Cosmetics
 Val Belcher (Class of 1972), former CFL All-Star
 Dr. Denton Cooley (Class of 1937), heart surgeon
 Wayne Graham (Class of 1954), professional baseball player Philadelphia Phillies, and New York Mets. Head Baseball Coach of the Rice University Owls
 Richard Haynes (lawyer) (Class of 1945), criminal defense attorney
 Larry Hovis (Class of 1954), actor, notably in long running TV sitcom, "Hogans' Heroes"
 Raymond Knight (Class of 1940), U.S. Army Air Corps Medal of Honor recipient
 Dan Rather (Class of 1950), journalist
 Craig Reynolds (Class of 1971), professional baseball player for the Pittsburgh Pirates, Seattle Mariners, and Houston Astros
 Martha Wong (Class of 1957), former Texas state representative
 Gwendolyn Zepeda (Class of 1990), author

References

Further reading
  Mellon, Ericka. "Investigarán problemas con calificaciones de estudiantes en otra escuela de HISD" (Archive). Houston Chronicle in La Voz de Houston. May 12, 2015.
 Villareal, Mario and Claudia Macias. "A Historical Outlook of the Mexican American Population Growth at Reagan High School." History paper, fall 1994. In the possession of Professor Guadalupe San Miguel of the University of Houston. San Miguel cited the paper in his book, Brown, Not White: School Integration and the Chicano Movement in Houston.

External links

 Heights High School

1927 establishments in Texas
Educational institutions established in 1927
Houston Independent School District high schools
Public high schools in Houston
Magnet schools in Houston
Houston Heights